The 1919–20 season was Blackpool F.C.'s 19th season (16th consecutive) in the Football League. They competed in the 22-team Division Two, then the second tier of English football, finishing fourth.

Joe Lane was the club's top scorer, with 28 goals (26 in the league and two in the FA Cup).

Season synopsis
Blackpool's League season began with three victories in their opening four fixtures. Inconsistency then took over until mid-October, when they managed to string four consecutive wins together. The unbeaten run continued for four more games, before a 3–0 home defeat to Huddersfield Town on 13 December  blotted their copybook.

Eleven wins in the second half of the campaign assisted in their fourth-placed finish.

The club's FA Cup run ended in the second round, with a defeat at local rivals Preston North End.

Table

Player statistics

Appearances

League
Mingay 41, Tulloch 35, Jones 22, Keenan 35, Wilson 22, Rooks 39, Charles 27, Heathcoate 31, Lane 30, Sibbald 32, Quinn 24, Fairhurst 27, Booth 8, Appleton 15, O'Doherty 1, Tremelling 7, Jacklin 1, McGinn 20, Burke 9, Hunter 11, Marsh 4, Bainbridge 1, Berry 5, Baker 7, Kent 5, Howard 1, Dumper 1, Barrass 1

Players used: 28

FA Cup
Mingay 3, Tulloch 3, Keenan 3, Wilson 3, Rooks 3, Charles 3, Heathcote 1, Lane 3, Quinn 3, Fairhurst 3, McGinn 2, Sibbald 3

Players used: 12

Goals

League
Lane 26, Heathcote 13, Sibbald 6, Charles 4, Quinn 4, Hunter 4, Rooks 3, Booth 2, Wilson 1, McGinn 1, Berry 1

Goals scored: 65

FA Cup
Lane 2, Charles 1, Sibbald 1, Quinn 1

Goals scored: 5

Transfers

In

Out

References

Blackpool F.C.
Blackpool F.C. seasons